The 2010 UniCredit Czech Open was a professional tennis tournament played on outdoor red clay courts. It was part of the 2010 ATP Challenger Tour. It took place in Prostějov, Czech Republic between 31 May and 5 June 2010.

ATP entrants

Seeds

 Rankings are as of May 24, 2010.

Other entrants
The following players received wildcards into the singles main draw:
  Victor Hănescu
  Albert Montañés
  Robert Rumler
  Radek Štěpánek

The following players received entry from the qualifying draw:
  Ilya Belyaev
  Jaroslav Pospíšil
  Nicholas Renevand
  Marek Semjan

Champions

Singles

 Jan Hájek def.  Radek Štěpánek, 6–0, ret.

Doubles

 Marcel Granollers /  David Marrero def.  Johan Brunström /  Jean-Julien Rojer, 3–6, 6–4, [10–6]

References
Official website
ITF search

UniCredit Czech Open
Czech Open (tennis)
2010 in Czech tennis
May 2010 sports events in Europe
Czech Open